Theo Champion (5 February 1887 – 20 September 1952) was a German painter. His work was part of the painting event in the art competition at the 1928 Summer Olympics.

References

1887 births
1952 deaths
20th-century German painters
20th-century German male artists
German male painters
Olympic competitors in art competitions
Artists from Düsseldorf